Echo modesta is a species of broad-winged damselfly in the family Calopterygidae.

The IUCN conservation status of Echo modesta is "LC", least concern, with no immediate threat to the species' survival. The population is stable. The IUCN status was reviewed in 2011.

References

Further reading

 

Calopterygidae
Articles created by Qbugbot
Insects described in 1902